The Ministry of Construction and Urbanism of the Republic of Serbia was the ministry in the Government of Serbia which was in charge of construction and urbanism. The ministry was merged into the Ministry of Construction, Transportation and Infrastructure on 27 April 2014.

List of ministers

Defunct government ministries of Serbia
1991 establishments in Serbia
Ministries established in 1991
2014 disestablishments in Serbia
Ministries disestablished in 2014